Piano is a 1989 solo album by jazz pianist George Shearing.

Reception

Scott Yanow reviewed the album for AllMusic and wrote that "The emphasis is on slower tempos and relaxed improvising but Shearing's distinctive solos and subtle creativity hold on to one's interest throughout. A tasteful set".

Track listing 
 "It Had to Be You" (Isham Jones, Gus Kahn) – 4:30
 "Daisy" – 5:15
 "Thinking of You" – 2:47
 "Sweet and Lovely" (Gus Arnheim, Charles N. Daniels, Harry Tobias) – 3:43
 "It's You or No One" (Sammy Cahn, Jule Styne) – 2:23
 "Wendy" (Milt Raskin, George Shearing) – 3:55
 "Am I Blue?" (Harry Akst, Grant Clarke) – 3:30
 "Miss Invisible" – 5:11
 "You're My Everything" (Mort Dixon, Harry Warren, Joe Young) – 4:22
 "John O'Groats" – 3:04
 "Waltz for Claudia" (Kevin Gibbs) – 3:14
 "For You" (Joe Burke, Al Dubin) – 4:12
 "Children's Waltz" – 4:06
 "Happiness Is a Thing Called Joe" (Harold Arlen, E.Y. "Yip" Harburg) – 4:13

Personnel 
George Shearing – piano
Production
Phil Edwards – engineer
Willis Conover – liner notes
George Horn – mastering
Carl Jefferson – producer
Richard Avedon – photography
Jim Hilson – assistant engineer
Michael McDonald – engineer, remixing

References

1989 albums
Albums produced by Carl Jefferson
Concord Records albums
George Shearing albums
Instrumental albums
Solo piano jazz albums